The Agena Target Vehicle (ATV), also known as Gemini-Agena Target Vehicle (GATV), was an uncrewed spacecraft used by NASA during its Gemini program to develop and practice orbital space rendezvous and docking techniques, and to perform large orbital changes, in preparation for the Apollo program lunar missions.
The spacecraft was based on Lockheed Aircraft's Agena-D upper stage rocket, fitted with a docking target manufactured by McDonnell Aircraft. The name 'Agena' derived from the star Beta Centauri, also known as Agena.

The ATV for Gemini 6 failed on launch on October 25, 1965, which led NASA to develop a backup: the Augmented Target Docking Adapter (ATDA), a smaller spacecraft consisting of the docking target with an attitude control propulsion system but without the Agena orbital change rocket. The ATDA was used once on Gemini 9A after a second ATV launch failure on May 17, 1966, but failed as a docking target because its launch shroud failed to separate.

Operations

Each ATV consisted of an Agena-D-derivative upper rocket stage built by Lockheed Aircraft and a docking adapter built by McDonnell Aircraft. The Agena was launched from Cape Kennedy's Launch Complex 14 on top of an Atlas booster built by the Convair division of General Dynamics. The Agena first burn would occur shortly after shroud jettison and separation from the Atlas over the Atlantic Ocean. Over Ascension Island, a second burn would place the Agena into a low circular orbit.

The McDonnell Gemini spacecraft would then be launched from Launch Complex 19, as soon as 90 minutes later. Both countdowns would proceed in parallel and required close synchronization. The Gemini would rendezvous and dock with the Agena as soon as Gemini's first orbit toward the end of the program. Gemini 11's Richard F. Gordon, Jr. compared docking with the Agena to air-to-air refueling:

Once docked, the astronaut in the right seat could control Agena's thrusters and engine. They would fly the combined spacecraft in a stabilized mode and perform a number of experiments:
 Using the Agena's attitude control system to stabilize the combination, which saved the Gemini's propellants
 Extra-vehicular activity to perform practice work on a tool panel. This required installing handrails on later flights to prevent excessive astronaut exertion.
 Refiring the Agena engine to raise the spacecraft's apogee. The modified Bell 8247 engine was qualified for up to 15 restarts.
 Undocking, unreeling a  nylon tether between the capsule and the Agena and flying in a "dumbbell" configuration with the Agena below the astronauts, to check the gravitational effect on the formation stability in uncontrolled mode. This technique is now known as gravity-gradient stabilization.
 Using a similar tether and a few thruster bursts to rotate the two craft around each other as an early test of artificial gravity.
 After rendezvous with its own ATV, Gemini 10 performed a second rendezvous with the ATV from Gemini 8.

After the Gemini capsule separated for the last time, the Agena remained in orbit for a short time and was used to verify the command system.

The first Gemini-Agena Target Vehicle (GATV) was launched on October 25, 1965, while the Gemini 6 astronauts were waiting on the pad. While the Atlas performed normally, the Agena's engine exploded during orbital injection. Since the rendezvous and docking was the primary objective, the Gemini 6 mission was scrubbed, and replaced with the alternate mission Gemini 6A, which rendezvoused (but could not dock) with Gemini 7 in December.

An investigation into the failure concluded that it was most likely caused by design modifications to the GATV versus a standard Agena D stage. The Agena D was designed to have its engine restarted just once while the GATV would need to be restarted five times. While a standard Agena D pumped oxidizer into the combustion chamber first and then followed with the fuel, the GATV was modified to do the reverse because the normal start method had a tendency to leak oxidizer. While this would not be a problem for the Agena D with its single restart, the multi-restart GATV would eventually lose all of its oxidizer before the stage's operating life (which would last weeks instead of hours) could be completed. Unfortunately, pumping the fuel into the combustion chamber first caused the engine to backfire and rupture from mechanical shock. It was found out that Lockheed engineers did not properly test the GATV to root out this problem (it had been tested at a simulated altitude of 21 miles up when actual Agena engine start would occur at around 75 miles up). The solution to the problem was switching back to the normal oxidizer-first engine start and also testing the GATV in appropriate conditions. Bell Aerosystems, the manufacturer of the Agena's engine, were also instructed to perform further ground-level tests.

Augmented Target Docking Adapter

After the failure of the first GATV, NASA commissioned McDonnell to develop a backup docking target minus the Lockheed Agena rocket, the Augmented Target Docking Adapter (ATDA). This consisted of the Gemini docking collar and an attitude control propulsion system based on the Gemini Reentry Control System.
A few questions were raised about the compatibility of the ATDA with the Atlas booster, since it had much lower mass than the GATV, potentially throwing off the launch vehicle's aerodynamics and calibrated settings. However, Convair assured McDonnell that it would pose no technical issues with the booster.

A second GATV launch failure occurred on May 17, 1966, as Gemini 9 astronauts Tom Stafford and Eugene Cernan sat on their pad awaiting launch. The Atlas–Agena lifted smoothly into a cloudy sky, vanishing from view around T+50 seconds. Shortly before Booster Engine Cutoff (BECO), the guidance control officer announced that he had lost contact with the booster.

Telemetry indicated that Agena staging had taken place on schedule at T+300 seconds. The Agena continued transmitting signals until T+436 seconds, when all telemetry ceased. Hidden behind clouds, the Atlas's B-2 engine gimbaled hard to right starting at T+120 seconds and remained fixed in that position, flipping the launch vehicle 216° around and sending it back towards Cape Kennedy. This rotation had made it impossible for ground guidance to lock on. Radar stations in the Bahamas tracked it heading north and descending. Vehicle stability was gradually regained following BECO, however it had pitched approximately 231° from its intended flight path. Both vehicles plunged into the Atlantic Ocean  downrange. The Agena's engine did not activate since the proper altitude and velocity had not been attained, preventing the guidance system from sending the start command. While the exact cause of the engine gimbal control loss was not found, telemetry indicated that a short-to-ground occurred in the circuit for the servoamplifier output command signal, which may have been caused by cryogenic leakage in the thrust section. Substantiating this theory were abnormally low thrust section temperatures starting at T+65 seconds. The source of the cryogenic leakage was not identified. The loss of the lock on the ground prevented normal engine cutoff signals from being transmitted to the Atlas; BECO was generated by the staging backup accelerometer, SECO at T+273 seconds due to LOX depletion, and VECO and Agena staging from a backup command generated by the missile programmer. Aside from the flight control system, all Atlas systems functioned properly.

While Convair accepted responsibility for the launch failure, Lockheed engineers expressed concern about telemetry data that indicated a servo failure in the Agena, leading to doubts as to whether the stage would have still operated properly if the Atlas hadn't malfunctioned. However, the true cause of failure surfaced when the Air Force released film taken by tracking cameras at Melbourne Beach, Florida, which showed the Atlas pitching over and heading downward. It was then determined that the Agena's servo malfunction was caused by passing through the Atlas's ionized exhaust trail.

The Gemini 9A modified mission launch was rescheduled for June 1, 1966, using the ATDA. However, the shroud that protected the docking adapter during launch failed to separate, due to lanyards being incorrectly secured with adhesive tape. Gemini 9A was launched on June 3, and when in orbit, the crew observed that the shroud of the ATDA had partially opened and was described by Stafford as "looking like an angry alligator". Docking was not possible, but the rendezvous maneuver was practiced instead.

Flight statistics

In popular culture
Gemini 8's docking with the Agena was shown in episode 1 "Can We Do This?", of the 1998 HBO miniseries From the Earth to the Moon.

Gemini 8's docking with the Agena featured in the short science fiction drama DARKSIDE produced by nrgpix as an entry  to the London Sci Fi film festival 2020.

Gemini 8's docking with the Agena is featured in the 2018 Neil Armstrong biopic First Man.

References

External links
 Gemini 6/Agena target vehicle 5002 systems test evaluation (PDF) December 1965
 Gemini 6 Agena Target vehicle
 Gemini 8 Docks with Agena Video
 On the Shoulders of Titans, Project Gemini, NASA history

1965 in spaceflight
1966 in spaceflight
Project Gemini
Spacecraft launched by Atlas-Agena rockets

fr:Agena (fusée-cible)